Major General Zaw Min Tun (also spelt Zaw Min Htun) is a Burmese army general and incumbent Deputy Minister of Information, concurrently serving as the Chief of the Tatmadaw True News Information Team, and head of the State Administration Council's press team. He is also a senior spokesman for the Myanmar Army.

Zaw Min Tun graduated from the 37th intake of the Defense Services Academy.

Personal life 
Zaw Min Tun is married to Thin Thin Aung.

References 

Living people
Burmese generals
Year of birth missing (living people)